Love Wedding Repeat is a 2020 romantic comedy film written and directed by Dean Craig, in his feature directorial debut. A remake of the 2012 French romantic comedy film Plan de Table, the film stars Sam Claflin, Olivia Munn and Eleanor Tomlinson. It was released on 10 April 2020 by Netflix.

Plot
While in Rome visiting his sister Hayley, Jack tries to muster up the courage to kiss her roommate Dina before returning to London. However, they are interrupted by his roommate Greg, and after Jack and Dina awkwardly say their goodbyes, a frustrated Jack leaves with Greg.

Three years later, Jack is at Hayley's wedding. She informs Jack that Dina has come to the wedding and is newly single. After the ceremony, he and Dina meet for the first time in three years. They admit that they used to ask Hayley about one another.

Marc, Hayley's former school classmate, arrives uninvited while high on cocaine, confessing his love for her. She demands that he leave, but her husband Roberto appears and invites Marc to stay for the celebrations. Hayley asks Jack to drug him with her sleeping drops and he reluctantly agrees. Shortly after Jack places the drops into Marc's empty champagne glass, a group of children playfully rearrange the seating order. The narrator comments on the many variations eight people can sit at a table.

The drugged glass ends up with Bryan, the "maid of honour", who quickly drinks it all. While Jack and Dina reconnect, Marc blackmails Hayley by threatening to tell Roberto they had sex three weeks earlier. She again asks Jack to handle Marc, so he locks him in a cupboard. A sedated Bryan mumbles through his maid-of-honour speech before destroying the cake. The mayhem is exacerbated by the presence of Jack's vindictive ex-girlfriend and her current insecure, jealous boyfriend.

After a guest releases Marc from the cupboard, he grabs the microphone and exposes his affair with Hayley in front of all the guests. Upset, Roberto abandons Hayley, but when she tries to stop him, he accidentally falls over a balcony. The scene freezes as the narrator reminds the audience of how the wedding can be affected by endless seating arrangements. In fast-forward, the film depicts a number of alternate scenarios where different guests are drugged each time, all ending in chaos.

In the last scenario, Jack is finally seated beside Dina, though he is the one that ends up drugged. Unable to regurgitate the sedative, he asks Bryan to insert his fingers down his throat. Dina walks in on them, much to Jack's embarrassment. They try to move past it back at the table, but as Dina tearfully opens up about her mother's death, Jack struggles to stay awake, upsetting her.

Things soon begin to look up for Jack and the other guests. Bryan gives a successful speech, impressing Vitelli, an important film director also in attendance, and hooks up with another guest, Rebecca. Following a conversation with Jack, Marc decides against exposing the affair. Instead, he wishes Hayley and Roberto the best and leaves.

As Dina is leaving the wedding due to a work emergency, Jack attempts to connect with her for the last time. She says that, although their feelings were mutual, they missed their moment and she leaves. Having finally landed an opportunity with Vitelli, Bryan inspires Jack to take chances when they come. So, he chases after Dina, catching her at the end of the street. They are nearly interrupted by a man passing by who claims to know Dina, but Jack tells him to go away and they finally kiss.

Cast
 Sam Claflin as Jack
 Olivia Munn as Dina 
 Eleanor Tomlinson as Hayley
 Joel Fry as Bryan
 Tim Key as Sidney
 Aisling Bea as Rebecca
 Jack Farthing as Marc
 Allan Mustafa as Chaz
 Freida Pinto as Amanda
 Paolo Mazzarelli as Vitelli
 Tiziano Caputo as Roberto

Production
The film was announced in April 2019, with Sam Claflin, Olivia Munn, Freida Pinto and Eleanor Tomlinson cast. Filming began in Rome on 6 May.

Release
In May 2019, Netflix acquired distribution rights to the film. The film was released on 10 April 2020.

Reception
The website's critics consensus reads, "Love Wedding Repeat takes the rough shape of beloved rom-coms from the past, but its beautiful setting and appealing cast can't compensate for a sodden story." On Metacritic, the film has a weighted average score of 41 out of 100, based on reviews from 17 critics, indicating "mixed or average reviews".

Owen Gleiberman of Variety wrote: "It unfolds, more or less, in real time, which gives it an existential comedy-of-suspense element that trumps the usual Styrofoam rom-com plotting. The classical music playing in the background doesn't make the film stodgy; it creates a sustained operatic flow. And the actors are simply terrific."
David Rooney of The Hollywood Reporter wrote: "There's just too little wit here amid all the cutesy misunderstandings and farcical mayhem to make Love Wedding Repeat anything but tedious froth."

References

External links
 
 

2020 films
2020 romantic comedy films
2020s British films
2020s English-language films
2020s Italian films
British remakes of French films
British romantic comedy films
English-language Italian films
English-language Netflix original films
Films about siblings
Films about weddings
Films set in Rome
Films shot in Rome
Italian remakes of French films
Italian romantic comedy films